The Northrop Gamma was a single-engine all-metal monoplane cargo aircraft used in the 1930s. Towards the end of its service life, it was developed into the A-17 light bomber.

Design and development
The Gamma was a further development of the successful Northrop Alpha and shared its predecessor's aerodynamic innovations with wing fillets and multicellular stressed-skin wing construction. Like late Alphas, the fixed landing gear was covered in distinctive aerodynamic spats, and the aircraft introduced a fully enclosed cockpit.

Operational history

The Gamma saw fairly limited civilian service as mail planes with Trans World Airlines but had an illustrious career as a flying laboratory and record-breaking aircraft. The US military found the design sufficiently interesting to encourage Northrop to develop it into what eventually became the Northrop A-17 light attack aircraft. Military versions of the Gamma saw combat with Chinese and Spanish Republican air forces. Twenty Five Gamma 2Es were assembled in China from components provided by Northrop; these were deployed in various attack missions during the early stages of the Second Sino-Japanese War, particular against Imperial Japanese naval assets. In the morning of 11 November 1937, three Chinese Air Force Northrop 2ECs of the 2nd BG, 14th Squadron led by Capt. Yu attacked the IJN fleet aircraft carrier Kaga off the Ma'anshan Islands; the bombs fell wide into Kaga's wake, and the Chinese Gammas were pursued and intercepted by three A5Ms of Kaga's combat air patrol led by flight leader Jirō Chōno, shooting down two (Gammas no. 1405 of Sung I-Ching and Li Xi-Yong, and no. 1402 of Peng Te-Ming and Li Huan-Chieh) while Yu managed to escape into the clouds and return his damaged Gamma to base.

On June 2, 1933 Frank Hawks flew his Gamma 2A "Sky Chief" from Los Angeles to New York in a record 13 hours, 26 minutes, and 15 seconds. In 1935, Howard Hughes improved on this time in his modified Gamma 2G making the west-east transcontinental run in 9 hours, 26 minutes, and 10 seconds.

The most famous Gamma was the Polar Star. The aircraft was carried via ship and offloaded onto the pack ice in the Ross Sea during Lincoln Ellsworth's 1934 expedition to Antarctica. The Gamma was almost lost when the ice underneath it broke, and had to be returned to the United States for repairs. Polar Stars second assignment to Antarctica in September 1934 was also futile — a connecting rod broke and the aircraft had to be returned yet again for repairs. On January 3, 1935, Ellsworth and pilot Bernt Balchen finally flew over Antarctica.

On November 23, 1935, Ellsworth and Canadian pilot Herbert Hollick-Kenyon attempted the world's first trans-Antarctic flight from Dundee Island in the Weddell Sea to Little America. The crew made four stops during their journey, in the process becoming the first people ever to visit Western Antarctica. During one stop, a blizzard completely packed the fuselage with snow which took a day to clear out.  On December 5, after traveling over 2,400 miles (3,865 km) the aircraft ran out of fuel just 25 miles (40 km) short of the goal. The intrepid crew took six days to travel the remainder of the journey and stayed in the abandoned Richard E. Byrd camp until being found by the Discovery II research vessel on January 15, 1936. Polar Star was later recovered and donated to the Smithsonian National Air and Space Museum.

Variants
Gamma 2A First production aircraft, sold to Texaco and flown by Frank Hawks as "Sky Chief", 785 hp (585 kW) Wright radial engine.
Gamma 2B Two-seat version with tandem controls, flown across Antarctica as the Polar Star, 500 hp (373 kW) Pratt & Whitney Wasp radial engine.
Gamma 2C (YA-13) Northrop-proposed attack version to compete with Curtiss A-12 Shrike armed with 4x 0.30 cal machine guns in the wings, 1x 0.30 cal machine gun on a flexible mount for rear defence, and up to 1,100 lb (500 kg) of bombs under the wings, evaluated by USAAC in 1933
XA-16 YA-13 prototype redesignated after being fitted with a Pratt & Whitney R-1830-9 engine
Gamma 2D Cargo version used by TWA, three built, 710 hp (529 kW) Wright Cyclone engine. One aircraft was converted into an "Experimental Overweather Laboratory" studying icing, superchargers, radios, and turbulence at 20,000–35,000 ft (6,100–10,670 m), then used by USAAC under the designation UC-100. Another retired TWA aircraft was used by Spanish Republican air force for coastal patrol. 
Gamma 2E Similar to Gamma 2C in armament except for a 1,600 lb (727 kg) bomb load, used by the Republic of China Air Force as a light bomber until 1938 with a number of aircraft built in China, one, as K5053, used by the British Aeroplane & Armament Experimental Establishment, and two supplied to the Imperial Japanese Navy Air Service, as the Northrop BXN, for evaluation in 1933.

Gamma 2F Another attack version developed in parallel with Gamma 2C, entered service as Northrop A-17 .
Gamma 2G Two-seat race version, originally with a Curtiss Conqueror engine, later changed to Pratt & Whitney Twin Wasp Jr., then to Wright Cyclone SGR-1820-G-5. Flown by Jacqueline Cochran and Howard Hughes.
Gamma 2H Testbed for Sperry automatic pilot, also flown by Russell Thaw to a third-place finish in the 1935 Bendix Trophy race.
Gamma 2J Two-seat trainer powered by 600 hp (448 kW) Pratt & Whitney Wasp with retractable undercarriage intended for USAAC. North American BC-1 preferred. Only one built.
Gamma 2L Used by Bristol for Bristol Hercules engine testing.
Gamma 5A One aircraft exported to Imperial Japanese Navy (designation BXN1) as a study in modern engineering.
Gamma 5B Two-seat version with the cockpits moved forward, used by the Spanish Republican air force for coastal patrol.
Gamma 5D One aircraft exported to Japan with "Army-type" equipment (designation BXN2), studied by Nakajima, then passed to Manchukuo National Airways which used it for aerial reconnaissance over China and USSR.

Operators

Military operators

 as BXN

Spanish Republican Air Force – Northrop 2D and 5B Gamma

United States Army Air Corps

Civil operators

Manchukuo National Airways

Trans World Airlines

Specifications (Gamma 2D)

Gallery

See also

References
Notes

Bibliography

 Eden, Paul and Soph Moeng. The Complete Encyclopedia of World Aircraft. London: Amber Books Ltd., 2002. .
 Francillon, René J. McDonnell Douglas Aircraft since 1920. London:Putnam, 1979. .
 Smith, M.J. Jr. Passenger Airliners of the United States, 1926–1991. Missoula, Montana: Pictorial Histories Publishing Company, 1986. .

External links

 Northrop Gamma photographs/history
 Northrop Gamma 2A, Sky Chief

1930s United States civil utility aircraft
Gamma
Low-wing aircraft
Single-engined tractor aircraft
Aircraft first flown in 1932
1930s United States mailplanes
Battles of the Second Sino-Japanese War